Baetis sahoensis is a species of mayflies in the genus Baetis. It lives exclusively in Japan, with reported sightings near the cities of Osaka and Sapporo.

References 

Mayflies
Insects of Japan
Insects described in 1980